The Western New York Flash (WNY Flash) was an American soccer club based in Elma, New York that competed in the United Women's Soccer league. They have won league championships in four different leagues: the USL W-League in 2010, Women's Professional Soccer in 2011, Women's Premier Soccer League Elite in 2012, and the National Women's Soccer League in 2016.

The team was founded in 2008 as the Buffalo Flash and played in the USL W-League from 2008 to 2010. In 2011, the team became the Western New York Flash and joined Women's Professional Soccer (WPS), its only season in the league. In 2012, the team was a member of Women's Premier Soccer League Elite (WPSL-E) following the folding of the WPS. The Flash won three consecutive league championships from 2010 to 2012 under head coach Aaran Lines: W-League in 2010, WPS in 2011, and WPSL-E in 2012. The Flash reached the inaugural NWSL Championship during the 2013 season, but fell to the Portland Thorns FC while searching for their fourth-straight title. In 2016, the team won the NWSL Championship for the first and only time.

The team was owned by the Sahlen family, who run the Sahlen's meat packing company in Buffalo. Joe Sahlen was the team's owner. His daughter, Alex Sahlen, was the team President and a former defender on the team.

History

2009
In 2009, Buffalo Flash made its debut in the Great Lakes (formerly Northern) Division of the Central Conference, lining up against teams from Hamilton, Laval, London, Ottawa, Quebec City, Rochester and Toronto. It finished second, with a regular season record of 9–2–3 from their 14 matches, undefeated in their seven games on the road, and with 40 goals scored, and 10 conceded. In the post-season playoffs, the Flash reached the Central Conference semi-final, to end their inaugural season with a 10–3–3 record. They were beaten 3–0 by FC Indiana, the only other full-time professional outfit in the league.

The 2009 team roster included players from six countries across four continents. There were four local players from Western NY, various US players from numerous states (including two with USA U-20 National Team experience), players from the full Italian National Team, Portuguese National Team, South African National Team, and also from Spain and Japan. To aid team bonding, the squad were housed in the same apartment complex.

2010
Before the 2010 season Buffalo Flash signed English trio Gemma Davison, Eartha Pond and Ann-Marie Heatherson. Mele French and Kelly Parker arrived from German club SC Freiburg. Kimberly Brandão returned despite attending a training camp with Sky Blue FC, but Erika Sutton left for the Boston Breakers and Sarah Wagenfuhr joined St. Louis Athletica.

In 2010 Buffalo Flash competed in the Midwest Division of the USL W-League, finishing the regular season 14–0–2 against Chicago Red Eleven, Cleveland Internationals, Kalamazoo Outrage and London Gryphons.
Buffalo Flash won the W-League Championship by defeating the Vancouver Whitecaps 3–1 at Harry Welch Stadium in Santa Clarita, California. They finished the season undefeated, while Kelly Parker was named W-League MVP.

2011

The team made plans to move to Women's Professional Soccer for the 2011 season. In September 2010, team president Alex Sahlen and coach Aaran Lines—both of whom have played for Rochester-based soccer teams—indicated that the team was looking at playing up to half of its WPS home games at Rochester's Marina Auto Stadium (now Rhinos Stadium). On September 24, WPS officially confirmed that the new team would indeed join the league. The name of the WPS team was announced as the Western New York Flash on December 1, 2010. The September announcement confirmed that the team would play half its home games at Marina Auto Stadium. The remaining games were originally intended to be played at Niagara Field, a smaller facility on the campus of Niagara University in Lewiston that was set to be expanded to 4,000 for the 2011 WPS season. The league also attempted to negotiate a deal with All-High Stadium in Buffalo, although the owners of the field, Buffalo Public Schools, never responded - likely due to existing conflict with four city high schools (which take precedence) and an agreement with Medaille College. However, the December announcement indicated that the entire 2011 home schedule would be in Rochester.

The Flash selected Alex Morgan with the first pick in the 2011 WPS Draft.

On January 25, 2011, the Flash signed 2009 and 2010 WPS MVP and WPS Golden Boot Marta.

With a 13–2–3 regular season record, the Flash earned the regular season title and the right to host the WPS Championship presented by Citi. On August 27, 2011, Western New York Flash capped their inaugural season in WPS by capturing the 2011 WPS Championship title 1–1 (5–4) in a penalty kick shootout in front of the largest championship crowd in league history.

2012

When it was announced that WPS had suspended its 2012 season, the Flash announced their plans to continue playing and shortly thereafter joined the new Women's Premier Soccer League Elite. During the 2012 playoffs, the Flash won the championship in penalty kicks.

2013

The Flash joined the newly formed National Women's Soccer League for its inaugural 2013 season. The team won the first-ever NWSL Shield after finishing in first during the regular season though they ended the season tied for first place with both FC Kansas City and Portland Thorns FC, but won the tiebreak over both teams to claim the shield. With the number one seed, the Flash earned home field advantage through the playoffs, and drew No. 4 Sky Blue FC for its semifinal match.

The team shutout Sky Blue 2–0 in the opening game, earning the right to host the Thorns in the 2013 NWSL Championship at Sahlen's Stadium in Rochester. The Flash ultimately finished second, losing to Portland in the championship game to the score of 2–0, denying the Flash a bid for a record-breaking fourth-straight title in a fourth different league.

2014

The Flash had one of their first down years during the 2014 season, unable to reach the heights of the previous season. They missed the playoffs for the first time in franchise history, placing seventh out of nine teams in NWSL.

2015

The Flash once again had a disappointing season, once again missing the playoffs with a seventh-place finish out of nine teams. The low finishes for the team in the past two seasons caused for quite a few cases of transition, most notably with long time head coach Aaran Lines who was eventually replaced by Paul Riley.

2016

The Flash had quite a bit of roster turnover as well as a new coach so expectations were low for the season, but the Flash ended up making the playoffs for the first time since the inaugural NWSL season. The semi-finals saw the Flash upset the top seed Portland Thorns FC away from home after scoring two goals during extra-time, thus partially avenging their NWSL Cup loss to the Thorns in 2013. The NWSL Championship saw the Flash face the Washington Spirit in Houston. The Flash eventually came out on top, winning their first ever NWSL Championship. This ended up being the final season for the WNY Flash in NWSL, with the franchise rights being sold to the owners of North Carolina FC, moved to Cary, North Carolina, and rebranded as the North Carolina Courage.

2017 
On March 7, 2017, the Flash announced that they would join the United Women's Soccer for their upcoming season, with the team playing matches in Buffalo for the first time since 2010. This is the fifth league overall that the Flash have played in during their nine years of existence. Gary Bruce, an assistant under Paul Riley, was named the new head coach.

Stadiums
In 2009 the team played their home games at Orchard Park High School Field, in Orchard Park, New York, 15 miles south-east of downtown Buffalo, New York, and trained daily at the nearby Sahlen's Sports Park in Elma, New York. In 2010 the team played home games at the Demske Sports Complex at Canisius College in Buffalo, New York.

In February 2011, the Sahlen family obtained the naming rights to Marina Auto Stadium in Rochester, which was called Sahlen's Stadium from 2011 through 2015. After that time, the team played their home games in Rochester.

The stadium has a seating capacity of 13,768. The stadium's highest attendance record was set on July 20, 2011 at 15,404 during a match between the Flash and magicJack (led by player-coach and Rochester native, Abby Wambach) after the 2011 FIFA Women's World Cup. The game was also the largest single-game crowd in WPS history.

The UWS Flash play most of their home matches at Niagara University, with one match in 2017 played at All-High Stadium.

Colors and badge
The Flash's home colors were white and away colors are red.  The Flash logo was designed to reflect that of Sahlen's, the team's parent company.

Year-by-year

Players

Notable former players
Former members of the team who have represented their respective senior national teams are:

Coaching staff
From 2009 to 2015, Aaran Lines led the team as head coach winning three consecutive league championships and the inaugural NWSL Shield. After he resigned in 2015, Paul Riley led the team to its first NWSL Championship in 2016, with Scott Vallow as an assistant and interim head coach during Riley's suspensions. Charlie Naimo served as Technical Director from 2014 to 2016.

Honors

League

NWSL Championship
 Winners (1): 2016
 Runners-up (1): 2013
NWSL Shield
 Winners (1): 2013
WPSL Elite Championship
 Winners (1): 2012
WPS Championship
 Winners (1): 2011
USL W-League Championship
 Winners (1): 2010

See also

 List of top-division football clubs in CONCACAF countries
 List of professional sports teams in the United States and Canada

References

Further reading
 Bankston, John (2013), Abby Wambach, Mitchell Lane Publishers, Inc., 
 Grainey, Timothy (2012), Beyond Bend It Like Beckham: The Global Phenomenon of Women's Soccer, University of Nebraska Press, 
 Lloyd, Carli (2016), When Nobody Was Watching: My Hard-Fought Journey to the Top of the Soccer World, Houghton Mifflin Harcourt, 
 Stevens, Dakota (2011), A Look at the Women's Professional Soccer Including the Soccer Associations, Teams, Players, Awards, and More, BiblioBazaar,

External links

 
 Sahlen's Buffalo Flash join W-League in 2009
 Sahlen's Sports Park

 
Sports in Buffalo, New York
Sports in Rochester, New York
Women's soccer clubs in New York (state)
USL W-League (1995–2015) teams
2008 establishments in New York (state)
Association football clubs established in 2008
National Women's Soccer League teams
2017 disestablishments in New York (state)
2017 establishments in New York (state)
Association football clubs established in 2017
Women's Premier Soccer League Elite teams
United Women's Soccer teams